Scopula ornata, the lace border, is a moth of the family Geometridae. The species was first described by Giovanni Antonio Scopoli in his 1763 Entomologia Carniolica. It is found in Europe, North Africa and the Near East.

Adults are on wing in May and June, then again from late July to September.

The larvae feed on various herbaceous plants, mainly Thymus, but also Achillea, Mentha, Origanum, Rumex, Taraxacum and Veronica.

Subspecies
Scopula ornata ornata
Scopula ornata enzela Prout, 1935
Scopula ornata Scopula subornata Prout, 1913

References

External links
Lace border at UKMoths
Lepiforum e.V.

Moths described in 1763
Moths of Europe
Moths of Africa
Moths of Asia
ornata
Taxa named by Giovanni Antonio Scopoli